The Howrah–Kharagpur line is part of the Howrah–Nagpur–Mumbai line, Howrah–Chennai main line and Kolkata Suburban Railway.

Geography
The line runs through the plains of West Bengal. From Howrah, it is first the Gangetic Plains and then the basins of the Damodar, Rupnarayan and Kangsabati, thereby traversing Howrah, Purba Medinipur and Paschim Medinipur districts.

Kolaghat Thermal Power Station, with its six tall chimneys, one for each of the 210 MW units, is a landmark on this line.
 
Haldia dock complex handled 31.015 million tonnes of traffic in 2011–12. Haldia Refinery, one of the eight operating refineries of Indian Oil Corporation, was commissioned in 1975. Haldia Petrochemicals, a modern naphtha based petrochemical complex and the second largest project of its kind in India, has been a catalyst for the development of a large number of downstream industries.

History
Bengal Nagpur Railway opened to traffic its main line from Nagpur to Asansol in 1891. Sini, on the Nagpur–Asansol line, was connected to Kharagpur and Kolaghat in 1898–99. The Kharagpur-Cuttack section was also opened the same year. The Kolaghat-Howrah track was completed in 1899–1900. Kharagpur was connected to Howrah with the opening of the Rupnarayan bridge on 19 April 1900.

The Panskura–Durgachak line was opened in 1968, at a time when Haldia Port was being constructed. It was subsequently extended to Haldia. Haldia Dock Complex, a part of Kolkata Port Trust, was commissioned in 1977.

The Tamluk–Digha line was opened in 2004.

Electrification
The Howrah–Kharagpur line was electrified in 1967–69. The Panskura–Haldia line was electrified in 1974–76. Santragachi–Bankaranayabaj sector was electrified in 1984–85. All lines were electrified with 25 kV AC overhead system. EMU train services between Panskura and Haldia introduced in 1976 and direct EMU services between Howrah and Haldia in 1979.

New lines
Indian Railways propose to lay a new line connecting Sealdah and Haldia, with the distance being shorter by 70  km than the Howrah–Haldia track.

There is a plan to connect Digha to Jaleswar on the Kharagpur–Puri  line.

The Howrah–Kharagpur stretch has three lines. There is a plan to build a fourth line for the Santragachi–Panskura–Kharagpur stretch.

Car and loco sheds
There are EMU car sheds at Tikiapara (for Howrah), Panskura and Kharagpur. Kharagpur has a diesel loco shed which houses WDM-2, WDM-3A and WDM-3B locos. Nimpura (for Kharagpur) has an electric loco shed. Santragachi has an electric loco shed and also an outstation trip shed. It houses WAP-4 and WAP-7 locos and can take in 50+ locos. Santragachi also has arrangements for rake maintenance. Kharagpur has workshops for loco, carriage and wagon overhaul.

Speed limits
The main line is classified as a "Group A" line which can take speeds up to 160 km/hr. The branch lines have speed limits within 100 km/hr.

Railway reorganization
The Bengal Nagpur Railway was nationalized in 1944.Eastern Railway was formed on 14 April 1952 with the portion of East Indian Railway Company east of Mughalsarai and the Bengal Nagpur Railway. In 1955, South Eastern Railway was carved out of Eastern Railway. It comprised lines mostly operated by BNR earlier. Amongst the new zones started in April 2003 were East Coast Railway  and South East Central Railway. Both these railways were carved out of South Eastern Railway.

Passenger movement
Howrah and Kharagpur on this line, are amongst the top hundred booking stations of Indian Railway.

References

External links
Trains at Howrah
 Trains at Panskura
 Trains at Kharagpur

|

5 ft 6 in gauge railways in India
Rail transport in West Bengal

Transport in Kharagpur
Rail transport in Howrah